Smilo Walther Hinko Oskar Constantin Wilhelm Freiherr von Lüttwitz (23 December 1895 – 19 May 1975) was a German general during World War II and son of Walther von Lüttwitz. After World War II he joined the Bundeswehr on 1 June 1957 and retired on 31 December 1960.

Biography
Lüttwitz was born on 23 December 1895 in Straßburg (now Strasbourg) into a family with a long history of military service. He joined the military service during the mobilisation on 3 August 1914 as an officer cadet in the 25th Division in Darmstadt. Lüttwitz was posted to the Eastern Front and saw combat at Tannenberg, Courland and Düna. He was severely wounded twice in 1915 and received the Iron Cross 1st class. He was commissioned as an officer in 1915.

In 1916 Lüttwitz was transferred to a staff position with the X Corps in the Heeresgruppe Kronprintz for two years. The corps was under the command of his father General Walther von Lüttwitz. His father, a recipient of the Pour le Mérite, was one of the most highly decorated generals of the German Empire. He returned to front line duty in 1918 as an adjutant with the Darmstädter Dragoner in the temporary occupation of the Ukraine and southern Russia. By the end of World War I he had received both classes of the Iron Cross and the Wound Badge in Silver. He remained in the Weimar Republic's Army, serving in various cavalry units. After the beginning of the Nazi leadership he joined the Panzer (armor) branch.

In 1939 he was promoted to lieutenant colonel and served as adjutant in the XV Army Corps. He was later commanding an infantry regiment and the 4th Rifle Brigade. He served on the Eastern Front. Later, he commanded the 26th Panzer Division in Italy, the LXXXV Army Corps and the 9th Army. During this time, he learned of the government issued orders for summary justice. He opposed it and faced a trial but was allowed to retain command of his unit.

He was released from internment in 1947. He then went to the Evangelical Academy in Friedewald. During the period of 1954 to 1957, he was the head business manager for the relief organization Order of St. John in Rolandseck. Later he returned to the Evangelical Academy as Head of Administration.

In 1957, he joined the new West German army (Bundeswehr) as a lieutenant general. He was appointed commanding general of the III Corps in Koblenz. He retired in 1960. In 1963, he became chairman of the board for a defense industry. In 1955, Lüttwitz was made a knight in the Order of St. John. In 1963, he took over as president of that organization. At the end of his military service, Lüttwitz received the American Legion of Merit in recognition of his service.

Awards
Iron Cross (1914) 2nd and 1st class
General Honor Decoration (Hesse)
Honour Cross of the World War 1914/1918
Wehrmacht Long Service Award 1st to 4th Class    
Clasp to the Iron Cross (1939) 2nd Class (6 October 1939) & 1st Class (27 May 1940)
German Cross in Gold on 27 October 1941 as Oberstleutnant and commander of the Schützen-Regiment 12
Knight's Cross of the Iron Cross with Oak Leaves and Swords
Knight's Cross on 14 January 1942 as Oberst and commander of the Schützen-Regiment 12
426th Oak Leaves on 16 March 1944 as Generalleutnant and commander of the 26. Panzer-Division
76th Swords on 4 July 1944 as Generalleutnant and commander of the 26. Panzer-Division
Rechtsritter (Knight of Justice) of the Order of Saint John (Bailiwick of Brandenburg)
Eastern Front Medal
Great Cross of Merit with star
Legion of Merit

References

Citations

Bibliography

 
 
 
 
 

1895 births
1976 deaths
Military personnel from Strasbourg
People from Alsace-Lorraine
German Army personnel of World War I
Generals of Panzer Troops
Bundeswehr generals
Barons of Germany
Knights Commander of the Order of Merit of the Federal Republic of Germany
Recipients of the Gold German Cross
Recipients of the Knight's Cross of the Iron Cross with Oak Leaves and Swords
Foreign recipients of the Legion of Merit
Lieutenant generals of the German Army